Solace for the Lonely is the fourth album by Robinella and the first album the group issued under this name. Prior to this release the group was known as Robinella and the CCstringband.

Track listing
"Break It Down
"Solace for the Lonely"
"Press On"
"Down the Mountain"
"Whippin Wind"
"Come Back My Way"
"Little Boy"
"Oh So Sexy"
"Teardrops"
"All I've Given"
"Waiting"
"Brand New Key"
"I Fall in Love as Much as I Can"

2006 albums
Dualtone Records albums